Çığlı is a village in Hakkâri Province in southeastern Turkey. It is located in the district of Çukurca District and the historical region of Hakkari.

In the village, there were churches of Mar Gewargis and Mar Saba.

Etymology
The Syriac and Turkish names of the village, Ashitha and Çığlı, respectively, both translate to "avalanche". Ashitha is derived from "ašīthā" ("avalanche" in Syriac), whilst Çığlı is likely a combination of "çığ" ("avalanche" in Turkish) and the adjectival suffix -li.

History
The church of Mar Saba was constructed in the 4th century. Ashitha was formerly exclusively inhabited by Assyrians, and was the centre of the lower Tyari district, and a rayyat (vassal) of the ashiret (free men) Tyari clan. It was formed by an aggregation of the villages of Jemane, Jemane Tahtaita, Mata d'Umra-Hatibet, Isrur, and Merwita. The village served as one of two places in the Hakkari region designated by the Patriarch of the Church of the East as a location for the resolution of disputes under the arbitration of a malik.

A large mission station was built at Ashitha by the American Protestant missionary Asahel Grant in September 1842. By the end of the month, he had also built a school with 20 pupils, and eight mule loads of Syriac books had arrived from Mosul. The size and position of the mission station atop an isolated hill, commanding the whole valley, unnerved Kurds and Turkish authorities, and sparked a series of events that led to the Kurdish massacres in Hakkari in 1843. Although Ashitha was spared after the village clergymen shamasha (deacon) Hinno and kasha (priest) Jindo had written to the Kurdish emir Bedir Khan Beg to pledge their allegiance and support, a number of villagers fled and took refuge in the village of Mūsākān in the Barwari Bala region.

Many villagers were killed during the massacres of 1846, and the mission station, which had been converted into a Kurdish fortress, was destroyed during the Ottoman suppression of the revolt of Bedir Khan in 1847. The village was inhabited by an estimated 2500 Assyrians with 400 families, all of whom were adherents of the Church of the East and were served by four priests and one functioning church in 1850 according to the English missionary George Percy Badger. Badger recorded that the villagers possessed 20,000 sheep, 1500 oxen, and 500 muskets. The population dropped to 300 Assyrian families with 20 priests when visited by Edward Lewes Cutts in 1877. The village was frequently visited by the Church of the East patriarchs Shimun XVII Abraham and his successor Shimun XVIII Rubil. In the late 19th century, Ashitha was targeted for conversion by Catholic missionaries. Throughout the century, the village had been a major centre of manuscript production.

Ashitha gave its name to the kaza of Chal and Ashitha in the sanjak of Hakkari in the Van Vilayet, which was populated by 200 Jews, 840 Turks, 11,000 Kurds, and 32,000 Assyrians, for a total of 43,890 people in 1900. In 1913, 350 Chaldean Catholics inhabited Ashitha, and were served by one priest as part of the archdiocese of Van. It was claimed in 1913 there was an incumbent Church of the East bishop of Ashitha, however, this is unlikely to be genuine. Amidst the Sayfo in the First World War, Ashitha was attacked by Turks and Kurds under Rashid Bey, Emir of Lower Barwari, on 11 June 1915, and the village was defended under the leadership of Zenkho of Bet Hiob and Lazar of Ashita. Ashitha fell after a day of fighting, and its population of 500 families fled into the mountains.

Villagers returned to rebuild in the early 1920s, but were expelled to Iraq by the Turkish government, and some founded the village of Sarsing in 1924. By 1933, a number of villagers had settled at Kani Balavi, and 15 former inhabitants, with 3 families, settled at Bandwaya by 1938. Ashitha has since been Turkified to Çığlı, and is now wholly populated by Kurds of the Kaşuran tribe.

Population 
Population history of the village from 2007 to 2022:

References
Notes

Citations

Bibliography

 

 
 
 
 
 
 
 
 
 
 

Historic Assyrian communities in Turkey
Kurdish settlements in Hakkâri Province
Places of the Assyrian genocide
Villages in Çukurca District